The 2021 Indiana State Sycamores football team represented Indiana State University as a member of the Missouri Valley Football Conference (MVFC) for the 2021 NCAA Division I FCS football season. They were led fourth-year head coach Curt Mallory. The Sycamores played their home games at Memorial Stadium in Terre Haute, Indiana.

Schedule

References

Indiana State
Indiana State Sycamores football seasons
Indiana State Sycamores football